Lauren Embree (born January 10, 1991) is an American former professional tennis player.

Born in Naples, Florida, Embree made her USTA Pro Circuit debut at the age of 16. As a junior, she competed at the 2006 US Open and reached the round of 16 at the 2009 Australian Open.

Embree graduated from Lely High School in Naples in 2009, and in May of the same year, she qualified as a wild card for the 2009 French Open, her first participation in a Grand Slam tournament. She lost to Nadia Petrova in the first round, and turned down a €15,000 prize to remain an amateur.

She accepted an athletic scholarship to attend the University of Florida in Gainesville, Florida, where she played for coach Roland Thornqvist's Florida Gators women's tennis team in National Collegiate Athletic Association (NCAA) competition from 2009 to 2013. Embree was a key member of the Gators' national championship teams that won the NCAA women's tennis tournament in 2011 and 2012. She graduated from the University of Florida with a bachelor's degree in sports management in 2014.

Lauren signed with athletic apparel brand Athletic DNA and became their first female professional.

ITF Circuit finals

Singles: 9 (2 titles, 7 runner-ups)

Doubles: 8 (5 titles, 3 runner-ups)

See also

 Florida Gators

References

External links

 
 

1991 births
Living people
American female tennis players
Florida Gators women's tennis players
Sportspeople from Naples, Florida
Tennis people from Florida